Jews are a minor ethno-religious group in Vietnam, presently consisting of only about 300 people. Although Jews have been present in Vietnam and Judaism has been practiced since the late 19th century, most adherents have been, and remain today, expatriates, with few to no native Vietnamese converts.

Nguyen Dynasty and French protectorate

19th century
The first Jews to visit Vietnam likely arrived during the Nguyễn dynasty and following the French colonization of the country in the latter half of the 19th century. There are a handful of references to Jewish settlement in Saigon sprinkled through the pages of the Jewish Chronicle in the 1860s and 1870s.

The Jewish Encyclopedia mentions a French merchant and ship-owner named Jules Rueff (1853-1907) being active in Indochina in the 1870s, becoming "one of the pioneers of French influence in that country." Per the Encyclopedia of Jewish Knowledge,  "in 1872 [Rueff] became one of the pioneers in the development of French Indo-China." He is also credited in other sources to have been both the "originator of the plan for the railroad of Saigon-Mỹ Tho, in Cochinchina, and the founder and general director of the 'Messageries Fluviales de Cochinchine'", which, with the backing of French governmental subsidies, greatly facilitated the spread of French trade in Indo-China by the route of Mekong river. Jules Rueff was still active in regional trade as late as April 1889, when he co-signed a petition to the French government requesting relief on duties being charged on cotton imports from Indochina.

A coastal and river steamship was later (1920) built in France and christened 'Jules Rueff' to recognize his role in the development of the region's maritime activities. This ship was sunk in 1943 during WWII by the US submarine Bowfin.

Between 1883 and 1886, Jewish soldiers and officers fought in the French army in the Tonkin Campaign.  One such soldier, from a family of multiple members in the French military was Louis Naquet.  Naquet, who eventually achieved the rank of Captain and was killed in action during World War I, received the Medaille du Tonkin for his actions in Tonkin and Annam, becoming chevalier of the 'Ordre Royal du Cambodge.

Early 20th century
According to the Universal Jewish Encyclopedia, Sylvain Lévi was the one of the founders of the École française d'Extrême-Orient (French School of the Far East) in Hanoi. The École française d'Extrême-Orient's website notes that the school was founded in Hanoi in 1902.

The Alliance Israélite Universelle appears to have had some activity in Haiphong during the 1920s.

According to the Universal Jewish Encyclopedia, between 1929 and 1932, the U.S. Consul in Saigon was a diplomat named Henry Samuel Waterman, who was Jewish. In 1930, Waterman reported back to the United States about the growth of communism in Vietnam, but his superiors at the State Department discounted his report, saying that the "French authorities have been stuffing him with a lot of hot air about the communistic menace." It turned out however, that Waterman's reports describing the Cong San were accurate, and referred to the Dang Cong San Viet Nam (Vietnamese Communist Party), directed from Moscow and Canton, and indeed there was a "growing threat to colonial rule in Southeast Asia."

World War II and Vichy France

As late as 1939, the estimated combined population of the Jewish communities of Haiphong, Hanoi, Saigon and Tourane in French Indochina numbered approximately 1,000 individuals. There were also reportedly eighty Jews in Tonkin during the period of Vichy rule, of which forty-nine were in the military and twenty-seven were in the foreign legion.

In 1940 the antisemitic Vichy-France Law on the status of Jews was implemented in French Indochina (Vietnam, Cambodia, Laos) by its Governor Jean Decoux.  In November 1940, Jewish people were limited to certain professions, and in July 1941 Jewish children were not allowed to be more than 2% of public school students.  By October 1942, fifteen government employees were dismissed from their positions for being Jewish (among the fifteen was Suzanne Karpeles, the director of the Buddhist Institutes in Phnom Penh and Vientiane), and Jews were "fired from a wide range of professions, from banking to the insurance, advertising, administration and business sectors." One such individual, Leo Lippmann, the former director of the Hanoi tram company, was dismissed from his position even after resigning from his post to assume a lesser position. However, since he had been categorized as a Jew because he had two Jewish grandparents and a Jewish wife, Lipmann divorced and no longer fell under the Jewish Statute. When it was deemed by state officials that the statute would have an adverse effect upon their racial Vichy motives for the region – such as the case of Georges Coedès, an employee at the government sponsored École française d'Extrême-Orient (French School of the Far East), who was deemed useful by the resident superior of Tonkin – an exemption to the discriminatory laws could be made. The anti-Jewish laws were repealed in January 1945.

Democratic Republic of Vietnam
In 1954, with the dissolution of French Indochina, Vietnam achieved independence as a divided state, with a communist north and a capitalist south. The French Premier who negotiated France's pullout from the Indochina region thus granting Vietnam its independence was Pierre Mendès France, who happened to be Jewish.  Prior to the French evacuation, the Jewish population in Indochina (which encompassed Vietnam, Laos and Cambodia) was reportedly 1,500, and most of those Jews were said to have left with the French, leaving behind no organized Jewish communal structure. On 25 May 1954 Robert Capa, a photo journalist made famous for providing the first photographs of the Allied landing on Omaha Beach, was killed while on assignment covering the French-Indochina War. The 1956 American Jewish Yearbook listed the Jewish population of French Indochina at 1,500, as noted above, but in its 1957 printing, there is no mention of a Jewish population in the region.

Ho Chi Minh reportedly suggested in 1946 that North Vietnam could serve as a home base for a Jewish government-in-exile before the establishment of the State of Israel. David Ben-Gurion, then the new executive head of the World Zionist Organization, first spoke of this encounter to the press in 1966.

Republic of Vietnam
In 1971, about 12 French Jews still remained in South Vietnam, all in Saigon. During the Vietnam War, temporary Jewish communities were organized throughout South Vietnam, consisting largely of United States military personnel. Approximately 30,000 Jewish-Americans served in the U.S. Armed Forces in Vietnam; amongst them, Colonel Jack H. Jacobs won the Medal of Honor for heroism for his service.

Socialist Republic of Vietnam
Gradually, as the communist government began accepting economic reforms, the number of Jewish visitors to the country increased.

The discovery of the wild saola species in Vietnam in 1993 made note in the Rabbi Jacob Joseph School Journal of Halacha and Contemporary Society's Fall 1999 issue.  Although the "odd, elusive creature... possibly on the verge of extinction" was not being considered for consumption, it was noted as an example of an animal that exhibited both kosher indicia but lacking a "mesorah" – an oral tradition required by many halachic decisors to declare the animal kosher.

In 2005, the U.S. State Department's "International Religious Freedom Report" noted "There were no reported anti-Semitic incidents during the period covered by this report. The country's small Jewish population is  almost entirely of expatriates."

In 2006, Chabad opened a center in Ho Chi Minh City, which is considered to be the economic center of Vietnam. A documentary about the Rabbi, Rabbi Menachem Hartman of the Chabad Center was made by Israeli TV Channel 8, and put online by Chabad. The film, (mostly in Hebrew with Russian subtitles) provides a look at the challenges faced by the emissaries upon their arrival, as well as a glimpse of the makeup of the Jewish community that existed upon their arrival. According to the Jewish Telegraphic Agency, the Chabad Center is reportedly used largely by business people and tourists from Israel and the United States, and as of 2007, there are some 100 Do Thai, or Jews in Hanoi and about 200 in Ho Chi Minh City. According to Hartman, about 10,000 to 15,000 Jewish business people and tourists visit Vietnam each year.
In 2014, Chabad opened the Jewish center in Hanoi.

Vietnamese refugees in Israel

From 1977 to 1979 the Prime Minister of Israel Menachem Begin permitted approximately 360 Vietnamese boat people fleeing the 1975 Communist takeover of Vietnam to enter the State of Israel granting them full Israeli citizenship and rights as well as government-subsidized apartments. According to the Vietnamese Embassy in Israel, by 2015 approximately 150 to 200 former Vietnamese refugees and descendants were still in Israel while about half have left Israel mainly for the US and France. Very few have formally converted to Judaism having retained their former religions.

Prominent Vietnamese in Israel
Vaan Nguyen (poet and actress), subject of an award-winning documentary The Journey of Vaan Nguyen.
Dr. Sabine Huynh (translator, sociologist and author), fled Vietnam for France in 1976 and has lived in Israel since 2001.
Dao Wong (banker), headed Bank Hapoalim in Singapore, now lives in Switzerland.

See also

Israel–Vietnam relations

References 

 
 
Jewish